Natalia Bykova and Svetlana Parkhomenko were the defending champions of the doubles title at the 1989 Virginia Slims of Kansas tennis tournament but did not compete that year.

Manon Bollegraf and Lise Gregory won in the final 6–2, 7–6 against Sandy Collins and Leila Meskhi.

Seeds
Champion seeds are indicated in bold text while text in italics indicates the round in which those seeds were eliminated.

 Betsy Nagelsen /  Catherine Suire (quarterfinals)
n/a
 Manon Bollegraf /  Lise Gregory (champions)
 Ronni Reis /  Paula Smith (semifinals)

Draw

References
 1989 Virginia Slims of Kansas Doubles Draw

Virginia Slims of Kansas
1989 WTA Tour